Xue Bing (薛 冰, born 5 January 1966) is a Chinese sprint canoer who competed in the late 1980s. At the 1988 Summer Olympics in Seoul, he was eliminated in the repechages of the K-2 500 m event and the semifinals of the K-2 1000 m.

References

1966 births
Canoeists at the 1988 Summer Olympics
Chinese male canoeists
Living people
Olympic canoeists of China
Asian Games medalists in canoeing
Canoeists at the 1990 Asian Games
Asian Games gold medalists for China
Asian Games bronze medalists for China
Medalists at the 1990 Asian Games